Trabzon Province is a province of Turkey on the Black Sea coast. Located in a strategically important region, Trabzon is one of the oldest trade port cities in Anatolia.  Neighbouring provinces are Giresun to the west, Gümüşhane to the southwest, Bayburt to the southeast and Rize to the east. İsmail Ustaoğlu was appointed the Governor of the province in October 2018.

The capital of the province is Trabzon.

Districts
Trabzon province is divided into 18 districts:
Trabzon (Central district, after 2014 it will be named Ortahisar)

Districts along the 114 km coastline (from west to east): Beşikdüzü, Vakfıkebir, Çarşıbaşı, Akçaabat, Yomra, Arsin, Araklı, Sürmene and Of.Districts inland: Tonya, Düzköy, Şalpazarı, Maçka, Köprübaşı, Dernekpazarı, Hayrat and Çaykara.

Beşikdüzü and Şalpazarı gained district status in 1988, Çarşıbaşı, Düzköy, Köprübaşı, Dernekpazarı and Hayrat in 1990.

History

Remarkably attractive throughout its history, Trabzon was the subject of hundreds of travel books by western travellers, some of whom had named it "city of tale in the East." The capital city Trabzon was founded, as Trapezus, by Greek colonists from Sinope, modern Sinop, Turkey. Starting from the 9th century BC, the city had also been mentioned by historians such as Homeros, Herodotus, Hesiodos. The first written source regarding Trabzon is Anabasis, authored by Xenophon. 

An important Roman and Byzantine centre, it was the capital of the Empire of Trebizond from 1204 to 1461. Trabzon was subsequently made part of the Ottoman Empire by Mehmet the Conqueror. After the region was conquered in 1461, the Fatih Medrese (1462), Hatuniye Medrese (1515), İskender Pasha Medrese (1529) and Hamza Pasha Medrese (1543) were established as important medreses (educational centers; some of them within külliye complexes) of the period. It was initially a sanjak before gaining the status of eyalet, and finally became a vilayet in 1868. 

The province was a site of major fighting between Ottoman and Russian forces during the Caucasus Campaign of World War I, which resulted in the capture of the city of Trabzon by the Russian army under command of Grand Duke Nicholas and Nikolai Yudenich in April 1916. The province was restored to Turkish control in early 1918 following Russia's exit from World War I with the Treaty of Brest-Litovsk.

In Turkey 
In September 1935 the third Inspectorate General (Umumi Müfettişlik, UM) was created.  Its creation was based on the Law 1164 from June 1927, which was passed in order to Turkefy the population. The Trabzon province was included in this area. The third UM span over the provinces of Erzurum, Artvin, Rize, Trabzon, Kars, Gümüşhane, Erzincan and Ağrı. It was governed by an Inspector General seated in the city of Erzurum. The Inspectorate General was dissolved in 1952 during the Government of the Democrat Party.

Archaeology 
In April 2021, archaeologists announced the discovery of Roman and Byzantine period archeological remains in the Ortahisar district. The southern part of the wicker columns and fortifications of the Roman emperor Hadrian's period, trench walls of Byzantine period dating back to 1460 have been discovered. Remains of Roman tiles and pottery were also discovered during the excavations. According to the Trabzon City Municipality, the excavation area is planned to be turned into an open-air museum.

Attractions
 Hagia Sophia of Trabzon
 Trabzon Castle
 Kalepark
 Sümela Monastery
 Kuştul Monastery
 Kaymaklı Monastery
 Vazelon Monastery
 Kızlar Monastery
 Fatih Mosque
 Yeni Cuma Mosque
 Nakip Mosque
 İskender Pasha Mosque
 Lake Uzungöl
 Pontic Mountains
 Saint Michael Church, also known as 'Saint Joseph Kilisesi', Akçaabat, Ortamahalle.

Demographics
2000 - 979,081
1997 - 858,687
1990 - 795,849
1985 - 786,194
1980 - 731,045
1975 - 719,008
1970 - 659,120
1965 - 595,782
1960 - 532,999
1955 - 462,249
1950 - 420,279
1945 - 395,733
1940 - 390,733
1935 - 360,679
1927 - 290,303

See also
 World Trade Center Trabzon
 Trabzon Museum
 Trabzon
 Chepni
 Pontic Greeks
 Kadirga Festival
 Araklı

References

External links
 Governorate of Trabzon
 Municipality of Trabzon
 Trabzonspor S.K.
 Culture of the Black Sea Region
 All about Trabzon